= Constituency PSW-137 =

Reserved constituency of the Provincial Assembly of Sindh, Pakistan

PSW-137
- Provincial Reserved constituency for the Provincial Assembly of Sindh

Current constituency

PSW-137 is a Constituency reserved for a female in the Provincial Assembly of Sindh.

== See also ==
- Sindh
